Pauno Kymäläinen (born 14 November 1949) is a Finnish former footballer. He capped 30 times for the Finland national team.

Career honors 
Finnish Championship: 1971, 1972, 1975

References 

1949 births
Finnish footballers
Finnish football managers
FC Jazz managers
People from Rauma, Finland
Living people
Association football defenders
Finland international footballers
Sportspeople from Satakunta